The Boxing Tournament at the 2002 Central American and Caribbean Games was held in San Salvador, El Salvador from November 29 to December 6.

Medal winners

See also
Boxing at the 2003 Pan American Games

References
Results on Amateur Boxing

C
C
C